The ninth season of the American television comedy series The Goldbergs premiered on September 22, 2021.

This is the first season without George Segal as Albert "Pops" Solomon, as Segal died in March 2021. The Pops character appears only in flashbacks in the season's first episode, which is dedicated to the actor.

Season 9 is also the last with Jeff Garlin as Murray. On December 15, 2021, it was announced that Garlin was leaving the show effective immediately due to multiple misconduct allegations and HR investigations. The show was filming the fifteenth episode at the time so from that episode onward, Garlin's character continued to appear on the show portrayed via the use of outtakes, a stand-in, and CGI.

In January 2022, the season's length was increased from 18 to 22 episodes. In May 2022, the series was renewed for a tenth season.

Cast

Main cast
Wendi McLendon-Covey as Beverly Goldberg
Sean Giambrone as Adam Goldberg
Troy Gentile as Barry Goldberg
Hayley Orrantia as Erica Goldberg
Sam Lerner as Geoff Schwartz
Jeff Garlin as Murray Goldberg

Recurring cast
David Koechner as Bill Lewis
Tim Meadows as Jon Glascott
Stephen Tobolowsky as Principal Earl Ball
Sadie Stanley as Brea Bee
Ken Lerner as Lou Schwartz
Mindy Sterling as Linda Schwartz
Beth Triffon as Joanne Schwartz
Jennifer Irwin as Virginia "Ginzy" Kremp
Stephanie Courtney as Essie Karp
Erinn Hayes as Jane Bales
Noah Munck as "Naked Rob" Smith
Matt Bush as Andy Cogan
Shayne Topp as Matt Bradley
Kenny Ridwan as Dave Kim
Judd Hirsch as Ben "Pop-Pop" Goldberg

Episodes

Ratings

References

The Goldbergs (2013 TV series) seasons
2021 American television seasons
2022 American television seasons